The 1997 Colorado Springs mayoral special election took place on April 1, 1997 to elect the mayor of Colorado Springs, Colorado. The election was triggered by the resigning of incumbent mayor Robert M. Isaac. The election was held concurrently with various other local elections. The election was officially nonpartisan.

Results

References

1997
1997 Colorado elections
1997 United States mayoral elections
Colorado Springs mayoral 1997